Normanton on Trent is a village in Nottinghamshire, England. It is nine miles south-east of Retford. 

According to the 2001 census it had a population of 299, increasing to 345 at the 2011 census and including Low Marnham. In 1848, it had 362 inhabitants. 

The parish church of St Matthew is a Grade II* listed building, dating from the 13th century.  Other listed buildings in Normanton include the Grade II listed Manor House on South Street; Normanton Hall on Main Street; and the former School House also on Main Street. The latter has an inscription: "Henry Jackson of this town Gent
built and endowed this school for four pounds a year for the education of ten poor children belonging to this parish Anno Dom 1776". 

There are two public houses, however there are no shops.  The nearest shop is the Co-Op, in Sutton-on-Trent. There is a Primary school in Normanton-on-Trent, St.Matthews C of E Primary school.

References

External links

Villages in Nottinghamshire
Civil parishes in Nottinghamshire
Bassetlaw District